The State Customs Committee of Azerbaijan Republic is a governmental agency within the Cabinet of Azerbaijan in charge of customs clearance for imports and exports, and regulation of all customs activities within Azerbaijan Republic. The committee is headed by Safar Mehdiyev.

History
Baku Customs Office was originally created in 1809 as a part of Astrakhan Customs District within the Russian Empire. On July 31, 1831, it was transferred to the Transcaucasian Customs District and in 1832 it was renamed to Baku Warehouse Customs. On May 4, 1847, the agency was transformed into Baku Quaranteen Customs Department. On December 8, 1897, according to a new law, the department was transformed into Baku Customs Department again and transferred to Tbilisi Caucasus Customs District on June 1, 1911. From 1918 until 1920, the committee functioned within the Ministry of Finance of Azerbaijan Democratic Republic. After the establishment of Soviet rule in Azerbaijan, the committee was restructured in 1929, 1946 and 1955. On January 27, 1989, according to the decree No. 17 of the Cabinet of Ministers of Azerbaijan SSR, Customs Office of Azerbaijan Republic was created and Astara and Julfa checkpoints were transferred under its jurisdiction. The committee was re-established as a governmental agency of Azerbaijan Republic on January 30, 1992, after the breakup of the Soviet Union and restoration of independence of Azerbaijan. Establishment of the committee helped accelerate the commodity turnover in the country and eased the import-export procedures. Over 20 customs chapters and 50 customs checkpoints were set up in Azerbaijan. It was effective in prevention of smuggling of illegal items and good through the state borders.

Structure
The committee is headed by its chairman. The main functions of the committee are enforcing the customs policy of and preparing the development program for customs activity in the Republic of Azerbaijan; preparation of economic programs and licensing of goods and commodities passing through customs checkpoints; collection of taxes and tariffs on goods passing through the border; issuance of certificates; arranging registration of cargo and transport; participation in the development and implementation of state policies for effective utilization and protection of natural reserves in the Azerbaijani sector of the Caspian Sea; assisting law enforcement agencies of Azerbaijan in combating international terrorism and drug trafficking; provision of statistical data on foreign trade customs and special customs bodies of Azerbaijan; undertaking measures for protection of rights and interests of individuals and legal enterprises while carrying out the customs activities; participation in activities of international customs organizations; arranging scientific researches in the customs sector.

Management

Single Window System 
According to the Decree dated November 11, 2008, by the President of Azerbaijan, “single window” principle started to be applied from 1 January 2009 on the inspection of goods and transportation at the border checkpoints. Customs Committee established a commission working on the implementation of “single window” principle in customs agencies on 18 November 2008 based on the Presidential Decree of 11 November 2008. Technological scheme determining the sequence of issuance of “permit” certificates was approved by the Customs Committee on 22 December 2009. Scheme provided customs officers to issue “permit” certificates at border checkpoints to vehicles, which perform customs, veterinary, photo-sanitary and sanitary quarantine control activities and international automobile transportation in accordance with legislation.

The head of State Customs Committee issued an order on 4 June 2009 to implement “Single window – Automated Management System” at the border checkpoints to control goods and transport crossing the border. In order to expand the implementation of “Single window – AMS”, Customs Committee issued another order on 12 August 2009, which provided to use pilot version of “Single window – AMS” in registration of goods and transportation at all customs offices of Customs Committee.

The process of examining goods and transportation crossing checkpoints at borders, global practices of implementing a single window system, international norms and standards relating to this issue were investigated by the State Customs Committee. Customs Committee started to monitor and examine all necessary licenses and permits to let the goods pass through borders according to the new system. Duplication of the process of controlling at the border was abolished and operations on documents were facilitated.

Central database used by different government bodies started to improve after a single window system was introduced. Information about kinds of products and transportation passing through border, swapping electronic certificates among appropriate agencies, pre-arrival notifications for declared goods and transportation crossing border, reports on infringement of customs rules, financial reports of trading parties is accumulated by the new system.

Mission 
“The mission of the Customs Service of the Republic of Azerbaijan is to protect the sovereignty, economic and national security of Republic, as well as to protect the health of our country, to improve social welfare of our people, to facilitate international trade, as well as to ensure security, minimizing contact, collecting custom payments and transferring them to the state budget, as well as eliminate the fraud in the field of customs and combating international terrorism.”

Duties 
Duties of agency include:

 Development of  legal, economic and organizational mechanisms for the implementation of the customs policy of the Republic, ensures their implementation
 Development and implementation of the program of development of customs affairs in the Republic of Azerbaijan
 Organize the implementation and improvement of customs control, takes measures to simplify and improve it without damaging the rationality of such control
 Participation in the development of economic programs and, within the framework of its authority, organize their implementation, including the licensing of goods passing through the customs borders of the Azerbaijan, price regulation and other non-tariff measures
 Organize collection of taxes, customs duties, excise taxes, and other customs payments for goods passing through the customs border of Azerbaijan 
 Organize a system of control over the correct determination of the customs value of goods
 ensures the  full transfer of customs duties and taxes to the state budget in time
 issue annuls or withdraws, in cases established by the legislation of Azerbaijan, licenses and qualification certificates, ensures the registry
 ensure the effective application of the relevant customs regimes while passing goods and vehicles of the customs borders of Azerbaijan 
 organize the development of rules for passing the customs borders of goods and vehicles and ensure  their implementation
 independently, and if necessary with the involvement of other law enforcement agencies, ensure  control over compliance with the customs control zone, organizes a system for the protection of customs infrastructure facilities, carries out other measures to protect the customs border of Azerbaijan 
 participate in the development of state policy on the effective use of biological resources in the sector of the Caspian Sea belonging to the Republic of Azerbaijan and its protection, provides within its authority control over compliance with the requirements of current legislation when passing through the customs borders of  Azerbaijan biological resources
 renders assistance to law enforcement bodies of Republic in preventing unlawful interference with the activities of international vehicles in railway stations, air and sea ports of Azerbaijan and fighting international terrorism
 exercise control over the observance of legality over the execution of decisions on smuggling and other crimes of responsible persons of the customs bodies of the Azerbaijan Republic in the customs sphere, on violations of customs rules and on administrative offenses that interfere with the normal operation of customs services, as well as in the implementation of search operations
 organize the maintenance of customs and special customs statistics of foreign trade of the Republic of Azerbaijan
 submit in accordance with the established procedure to the President of Azerbaijan, the Cabinet of Ministers of the Republic and other central executive authorities (on matters relating to their activities) customs statistics data and other information relating to customs matters
 creates, in accordance with the legislation of the Republic of Azerbaijan, a system for informing interested parties and providing them with consultations on customs issues
 in the implementation of customs, takes measures to protect the rights and interests of individuals and economic entities
 creates conditions for the implementation by individuals and legal entities of the rights to complain about decisions (including regulations) of the customs authorities of the Azerbaijan Republic, to the actions and inaction of its officials
 ensure timely and full consideration of complaints and appeals, takes measures to eliminate the causes that create violations of the rights and legitimate interests of individuals and legal entities
 within the limits of its authority, provide  for the publication of important regulations on customs matters
 conducts outreach work on the development and state of customs in Azerbaijan; uses for this purpose mass media and other means of information distribution
 ensure decision-making and activity on the application of legislation on customs matters regarding specific goods and economic activity
 summarize and analyzes the legislation on customs affairs in the Republic 
 participate in the work of international organizations dealing with customs issues; ensures the fulfillment by international customs obligations of Azerbaijan 
 cooperate and interacts with customs and other authorities of foreign countries
 organize research in the field of customs

Custom Committee Academy 

Custom committee academy was created according to the order #1972 by President Ilham Aliyev. In July 2013, official Charter of academy was adopted by Decree #939 of President.

In the 2014–15 academic year, 20 students of each specialty (Economics and Law) were enrolled in the first academic year.

See also
Cabinet of Azerbaijan
State Border Service of Azerbaijan Republic

References

Government agencies of Azerbaijan
Government agencies established in 1992
1992 establishments in Azerbaijan